The French ship Infatigable was launched in 1798 at Nantes. She became a privateer that the British Royal Navy captured in 1799 and named HMS Dispatch. The Navy never commissioned Dispatch and sold her in 1801.

Infatigable was commissioned in December 1798 with 120 men and 18 guns.

On 6 March 1799  captured the 18-gun privateer Infatigable in the Channel after a 10-hour chase. Infatigable was armed with 18 guns and had a crew of 120 men. She was only one day out of Nantes, provisioned for a four-month cruise. "Indefatigable" arrived at Portsmouth on 25 March and was laid up.

The "Principal officers and commissioners of His Majesty's Navy" offered Dispatch for sale on 24 August 1801. She sold on 7 September for £765.

Citations and references
Citations

References
 
 

1798 ships
Ships built in France
Privateer ships of France
Captured ships
Sloops of the Royal Navy